James Henry Hingston (b Blackrock 28 Nov 1884 - d Cork 6 November) was Archdeacon of Cork  from 1948 until 1954.

He was educated at Trinity College, Dublin and ordained in 1908.  After  curacies in Tudeley and Clonmelhe held incumbencies at Ballymartle, Kilshannig and Cork. He was Precentor of Cloyne Cathedral from 1946 until his appointment as Archdeacon.

References

Alumni of Trinity College Dublin
Archdeacons of Cork